Ectoedemia admiranda is a moth of the family Nepticulidae. It is especially susceptible to wing deformities. It was described by Puplesis in 1984. It is known from the Russian Far East.

References

Nepticulidae
Moths of Asia
Moths described in 1984